Bak Yeong-hee (Hangul: 박영희; born November 27, 1959 in Busan) is a South Korean voice actress who joined the Munhwa Broadcasting Corporation's Voice Acting Division in 1982, which is fan club headquartered in Goyang, Gyeonggi-do, South Korea.

Roles

Broadcast TV
 Ojamajo Doremi (Magical Remi from 1st - 3rd Series, Korea TV Edition, MBC and TV Special of Korea Edition, Tooniverse)
 Mirmo! (Mirmo Pong Pong Pong, Korea TV Edition, SBS)
 CSI: Miami (replacing Sofia Milos by season 2–3, Korea TV Edition, MBC)
 Buffy the Vampire Slayer (replacing Charisma Carpenter, Korea TV Edition, MBC)
 MacGyver (Korea TV Edition, MBC)
 Miracle Girls (Korea TV Edition, MBC)
 Time Adventure (Korea TV Edition, MBC)
 Knight Boy Ramu (Korea TV Edition, MBC)
 Adventure King's Gulliver (Korea TV Edition, MBC)
 Robinhood Adventure (Korea TV Edition, MBC)
 Escaplowne (Korea TV Edition, SBS)
 Minky (Korea TV Edition, SBS)
 El Hazard (Korea TV Edition, Tooniverse)
 Chun Chie in Love (Korea TV Edition, Tooniverse)
 Lupang (Korea TV Edition, Tooniverse)

Movie Dubbing 
 Star Wars (replacing Carrie Fisher, Korea TV Edition, MBC)
 Autumn in New York (replacing Winona Ryder, Korea TV Edition, MBC)
 The Butterfly Effect (replacing Melora Walters, Korea TV Edition, MBC)
 Elf (replacing Mary Steenburgen, Korea TV Edition, MBC)
 Chicago (replacing Renée Zellweger, Korea TV Edition, MBC)

See also
 Munhwa Broadcasting Corporation
 MBC Voice Acting Division

External links
 Yeong Hee Cham Sa Rang Fan Club Homepage (in Korean)
 MBC Voice Acting division Bak Yeong Hee blog (in Korean)

Living people
South Korean voice actresses
1959 births
People from Busan